Yonathan Suryatama Dasuki (born 21 November 1985) is a retired  Indonesian badminton player specializing in doubles from Djarum club. He won the men's doubles title at the 2005 Indonesian National Championships. In the international tournaments, Dasuki has been partnering with some players, like Rian Sukmawan and  Hendra Aprida Gunawan.

Career 
Yonathan Suryatama Dasuki won the 2005 National Championship with Yoga Ukikasah. Two years later he reached the first place at the Indonesia International. 2009 and 2010 he participated at the BWF World Championships. On both occasions he was 9th in the men's doubles.

Achievements

BWF Superseries (1 runner-up) 
The BWF Superseries, launched on 14 December 2006 and implemented in 2007, is a series of elite badminton tournaments, sanctioned by Badminton World Federation (BWF). BWF Superseries has two level such as Superseries and Superseries Premier. A season of Superseries features twelve tournaments around the world, which introduced since 2011, with successful players invited to the Superseries Finals held at the year end.

Men's doubles

  BWF Superseries Finals tournament
  BWF Superseries Premier tournament
  BWF Superseries tournament

BWF Grand Prix (1 title, 1 runner-up) 
The BWF Grand Prix has two levels, the BWF Grand Prix and Grand Prix Gold. It is a series of badminton tournaments sanctioned by the Badminton World Federation (BWF) since 2007.

Men's doubles

  BWF Grand Prix Gold tournament
  BWF Grand Prix tournament

BWF International Challenge/Series (2 titles, 3 runners-up) 
Men's doubles

Performance timeline

Individual competitions 
 Senior level

References

External links 
 

1985 births
Living people
People from Jember Regency
Sportspeople from East Java
Indonesian people of Chinese descent
Indonesian male badminton players